José Medina (born 13 February 1965) is a Mexican swimmer. He competed in the men's 4 × 100 metre freestyle relay at the 1984 Summer Olympics.

References

1965 births
Living people
Mexican male swimmers
Olympic swimmers of Mexico
Swimmers at the 1984 Summer Olympics
Sportspeople from Torreón
Mexican male freestyle swimmers
20th-century Mexican people